Automotive design is the process of developing the appearance (and to some extent the ergonomics) of motor vehicles - including automobiles, motorcycles, trucks, buses, coaches, and vans.

The functional design and development of a modern motor vehicle is typically done by a large team from many  different disciplines also included within automotive engineering, however, design roles are not associated with requirements for professional- or chartered-engineer qualifications. Automotive design in this context focuses primarily on developing the visual appearance or aesthetics of vehicles, while also becoming involved in the creation of product concepts. Automotive design as a professional vocation
is practiced by designers who may have an art background and a degree in industrial design or in transportation design. For the terminology used in the field, see the glossary of automotive design.

Design elements 

The task of the design team is usually split into three main aspects: exterior design, interior design, and color and trim design. Graphic design is also an aspect of automotive design; this is generally shared amongst the design team as the lead designer sees fit. The design focuses not only on the isolated outer shape of automobile parts, but concentrates on the combination of form and function, starting from the vehicle package.

The aesthetic value will need to correspond to ergonomic functionality and utility features as well. In particular, vehicular electronic components and parts will give more challenges to automotive designers who are required to update on the latest information and knowledge associated with emerging vehicular gadgetry, particularly dashtop mobile devices, like GPS navigation, satellite radio, HD radio, mobile TV, MP3 players, video playback, and smartphone interfaces. Though not all the new vehicular gadgets are to be designated as factory standard items, some of them may be integral to determining the future course of any specific vehicular models.

Exterior design 
The design team(s) responsible for the exterior of the vehicle develops the proportions, shape, and surface details of the vehicle. Exterior design is first done by a series of manual sketches and digital drawings. Progressively, drawings that are more detailed are executed and approved by appropriate layers of management, followed by digital rendering to images. Consumer feedback is generally sought at this point to help iteratively refine vehicle concepts according to the targeted market and will continue throughout the rest of the design refinement process.  After more progressive refinement, industrial plasticine and or digital models are developed from and along with the drawings and images. The data from these models are then used to create quarter-scale and finally full-sized mock-ups of the final design. With three- and five-axis CNC milling machines, the clay model is first designed in a computer program and then "carved" using the machine and large amounts of clay. Even in times of photorealistic 3D (three dimensional) software and virtual models on power walls, the clay model is still the most important tool for a final evaluation of the exterior design of a vehicle and, therefore, is used throughout the industry.

Interior design 
The designer responsible for the vehicles' interior develops the proportions, shape, placement, and surfaces for the instrument panel, seats, door trim panels, headliner, pillar trims, etc. Here the emphasis is on ergonomics and the comfort of the passengers. The procedure here is the same as with exterior design (sketch, digital model, and clay model).

Color and trim design 
The color and trim (or color and materials) designer is responsible for the research, design, and development of all interior and exterior colors and materials used on a vehicle. These include paints, plastics, fabric designs, leather, grains, carpet, headliner, wood trim, and so on. Color, contrast, texture, and pattern must be carefully combined to give the vehicle a unique interior environment experience. Designers work closely with the exterior and interior designers.

Designers draw inspiration from other design disciplines such as: industrial design, fashion, home furnishing, architecture, and sometimes product design. Specific research is done into global trends to design for projects two to three model years in the future. Trend boards are created from this research in order to keep track of design influences as they relate to the automotive industry. The designer then uses this information to develop themes and concepts that are then further refined and tested on the vehicle models.

Graphic design 
The design team also develops graphics for items, such as badges, decals, dials, switches, kick or tread strips, or liveries.

Computer-Aided Design and Class-A development
The sketches and rendering are transformed into 3D digital surface modeling and rendering for real-time evaluation with Math data in initial stages. During the development process succeeding phases will require the 3D model fully developed to meet the aesthetic requirements of a designer and well as all engineering and manufacturing requirements. The fully developed CAS digital model will be re-developed for manufacturing meeting the Class-A surface standards that involve both technical as well as aesthetics. This data will be further developed by a Product Engineering team. These modelers usually have a background in industrial design or sometimes tooling engineering in the case of some Class-A modelers. Autodesk Alias and ICEM Surf are the two most widely used software tools for Class-A development.

Development process

Design development cycle
Several manufacturers have slightly varied development cycles for designing an automobile, but in practice, these are the following:
 Design and consumer research
 Concept development sketching 
 CAS (Computer Aided Styling) 
 Clay modeling
 Interior buck model
 Vehicle ergonomics 
 Class-A Surface Development 
 Color and trim 
 Vehicle graphics
The design process occurs concurrently with other product engineers who will be engineering the styling data for meeting performance, manufacturing, and safety regulations. From mid-phase, back and forth interactions between the designers and product engineers culminate into a finished product be manufacturing ready.

Apart from this the engineering team parallelly works in the following areas. Product Engineering (Body In White Sheetmetal Design and Plastic engineering), NVH Development team, Prototype development, Powertrain engineering, Physical Vehicle validation, Tool and Die development, and Manufacturing process design.

Development team
The design team for a specific model consists of a chief designer and an exterior as well as an interior designer. In some cases, all three roles are done by one designer. Several junior designers are involved in the development process as well who make specific contributions all overseen by the chief designer. Apart from this, the color and trim designer works closely with other designers. The clay model team and digital model team work closely with the styling team all located within the studio. Apart from this, there would be studio heads, studio managers, and prototype engineers who would work across all teams in the studio. The total team size for developing a full car usually ranges from 25 to 40 members and the development time lasts for more than 24 months until signed-off for tooling and production. Thereafter a smaller team would be working until vehicle launch.

History

United States

In the United States, automotive design reached a turning point in the 1920s when the American national automobile market began reaching saturation. To maintain unit sales, General Motors head Alfred P. Sloan Jr. suggested annual model-year design changes to convince car owners that they needed to buy a new replacement each year, an idea borrowed from the bicycle industry (though Sloan usually gets the credit or blame). Critics called his strategy planned obsolescence. Sloan preferred the term "dynamic obsolescence". This strategy had far-reaching effects on the auto business, the field of product design, and eventually the American economy.

The smaller automakers could not maintain the pace and expense of yearly re-styling. Henry Ford did not like the model-year change because he clung to an engineer's notions of simplicity, economics of scale, and design integrity. GM surpassed Ford's sales in 1931 and became the dominant company in the industry thereafter. The frequent design changes also made it necessary to use a body-on-frame rather than the lighter but less adaptable monocoque design used by most European automakers.
Some U.S. designers include Gordon Buehrig, who was responsible for the Auburn 851, as well as the Cord 810 and 812 (hence also the Hupmobile Skylark and the Graham Hollywood).

In the 1930s, Chrysler's innovations with aerodynamics helped launch the Chrysler Airflow in 1934, which was revolutionary and radical compared to the contemporary vehicles. However, inadequate consumer acceptance of the advanced appearance of the cars forced a re-design of succeeding models of the Airflow. This marketing experience made the entire industry take note of the high risks involved in incorporating major design advancements into their production cars.

A major influence on American auto styling and marketing was Harley Earl, who brought the tailfin and other aeronautical design references to auto design starting with the rear fenders of the 1948 Cadillac. Another notable designer was Chrysler group's designer Virgil Exner, who developed the Forward look design in the mid-1950s. Exner is also credited with using wind tunnel testing to justify incorporating tailfins, thus moving the company away from boxy-looking cars into more aerodynamic and futuristic designs. Raymond Loewy was responsible for a number of Studebaker vehicles, such as the Starlight (including the bullet-nose).

Starting in the 1960s, Dick Teague, who spent most of his career with American Motors Corporation (AMC), originated the concept of using interchangeable body panels so as to create a wide array of different vehicles using the same stampings, starting with the AMC Cavalier. Teague was responsible for unique automotive designs such as the two-seat AMC AMX muscle car, the subcompact Gremlin, the Pacer, and Matador coupe, as well as the original and market segment-creating, Jeep Cherokee (introduced in 1983, and built to 2001 in the U.S. and through 2005 in China).

Additionally during the 1960s, Ford's first-generation Ford Mustang and Thunderbird marked another era leading into new market segments from Detroit. The Ford Mustang achieved record sales in its first year of production and established the pony car segment.

Personal injury litigation has had an effect on the design and appearance of the car in the 20th century.

Europe 

Until World War I, most of the automakers were concerned with mechanical reliability rather than its external appearance. Later, luxury and aesthetics became a demand and also an effective marketing tool. Designs from each nation with its own strong cultural identity reflected in their exterior and interior designs. World War II slowed the progress, but after the early-1950s, Italian designers set the trend and remained the driving force until the early part of the 1980s.

France 

In France notable designs came from Bugatti and Avions Voisin. Of the mass-selling cars Citroën, launched their vehicles with innovative designs and engineering and mostly aided by the styling of Flaminio Bertoni as evident from Citroën DS. After World War II, with the disappearance of the coach building industry, French automakers (except Citroën) followed British and other popular trends until they gained financial stability. During the 1980s, manufacturers like Renault cultivated their own strong design identities with designers like Patrick Le Quément. Peugeot, which was dependent on Pininfarina since the early post-war period, later established its own brand identity from the 1980s onwards. Its other company, Citroën, still retains its distinctive French innovations for its designs.

Great Britain 

Great Britain was Europe's leading manufacturer of automobiles until the late-1960s. During that era, there were more British-based automakers than in the rest of Europe combined. The British automobile industry catered to all segments ranging from compact, budget, sports, utility, and luxury-type cars. Car design in Britain was markedly different from other European designs largely because British designers were not influenced by other European art or design movements, as well as the British clay modelers, used a different sweep set.

British cars until World War II were sold in most of the British colonies. Innovations in vehicle packaging and chassis engineering combined with global familiarity with British designs meant vehicles were acceptable to public tastes at that time. British skilled resources like panel beaters, die machinists, and clay modelers were also available also partly due to their involvement with the motorsport industry.

Still, during the 1960s, British manufacturers sought professional help from the Italians, such as Giovanni Michelotti, Ercole Spada, and Pininfarina. Notable British contributions to automobile designs were Morris Mini by Alec Issigonis, several Jaguar Cars by Sir William Lyons and Malcolm Sayer, Aston Martin DB Series, and several cars from Triumph and MG. Ford Europe based in Great Britain, is notable for the Ford Sierra line, a creation of Uwe Bahnsen, Robert Lutz, and Patrick le Quément. Other British designers were William Towns for Aston Martin cars and David Bache for Land Rover and Range Rover vehicles.

Germany 

Germany is often considered the birthplace of industrial design with Bauhaus School of Design. However, the Nazi regime closed down the design school. Ferdinand Porsche and his family played a significant role in German design. Mercedes Benz passenger cars were also in the luxury segment and played more importance to aesthetics. After the 1980s, German design evolved into a distinctive Teutonic style often to complement their high engineered cars suited to Autobahns. The early German design clues of present-day owes some part to Italian designers like Giovanni Michelotti, Ercole Spada, Bruno Sacco, and Giorgetto Giugiaro. During the mid- and late-20th century one of the most influential coach builder/designer in Germany was Karmann.

German designs started gaining popularity after the 1980s, notable after the formation of Audi. Volkswagen, which was dependent on Marcello Gandini, Giorgetto Giugiaro, and Karmann, later formed the contemporary design language along with Audi. BMW entered the automobile design with sporty-looking everyday sedans using Giovanni Michelotti. These models were later enhanced by Ercole Spada into the 1980s, and Klaus Luthe until the mid-1990s. The American-born designer Chris Bangle was hired by BMW in the late-1990s to re-define the brand. Bangle incorporated new single press technology for compound curves to add controversial styling elements to his designs.

The Porsche family contribution was instrumental in the evolution of Porsche cars, while the Italian designer Bruno Sacco helped create various Mercedes Models from the 1960s to the 1990s.

Italy 

In Italy, companies like Fiat and Alfa Romeo played a major role in car design. Many coachbuilders were dependent on these two major manufacturers. Italian manufacturers had a large presence in motorsports leading to several sport car manufacturers like Ferrari, Lancia, Lamborghini, Maserati, etc. During the late-1950s, Italian automobile designs gained global popularity coinciding with the modern fashion and architecture at that time around the world. Various design and technical schools in Turin turned out designers on a large scale. By the late-1960s, almost all Italian coachbuilders transformed into design studios catering to automakers around the world. The trend continued in the 1990s when the Japanese and Korean manufacturers sourced designs from these styling studios. One example is Pininfarina.

Italian designers whose designs services were sought globally are Giovanni Michelotti, Ercole Spada, Bruno Sacco, Marcello Gandini, Giorgetto Giugiaro, and Walter de Silva.

Scandinavia 

Sweden had Volvo and Saab as domestic automakers, and the nation's northern location required that cars needed to withstand Nordic climate conditions. The Scandinavian design elements are known for their minimalism and simplicity. One of the early original Scandinavian designs was the Saab 92001 by Sixten Sason and Gunnar Ljungström.

Czechoslovakia 

Prior to World War II and until the early-1990s, Czechoslovakia had strong presence in the automotive industry with manufacturers like Skoda, Jawa, Tatra, CZ, Praga, and Zetor. Czech automobiles were generally known for their originality in mechanical simplicity and designs were remarkably Bohemian as evident from Tatra cars and Jawa motorcycles. During the Communist regime, the design started falling back and ultimately the domestic automakers ended up as subsidiaries of EU-based companies.

See also 

 Automotive aerodynamics
 Industrial Design
 Automotive Engineering
 Alternative propulsion
 Automobile layout
 Computer-aided industrial design
 Automotive design terminology
 Coachbuilder
 Car body style
 Car classification
 Car model
 Car safety
 Cab forward
 Concept vehicle
 Dashtop mobile
 List of automotive designers
 Ecodesign
 Facelift (automobile)
 Virtual tuning
 H-point
 Mass production
 Packages
 Platform
 Ponton styling
 Pre-production car
 Prototype
 Solid freeform fabrication
 Three-box design
 Wind tunnel

References

Further reading

External links